You Had Me at Hello may refer to:

 A romantic line said in the 1996 film Jerry Maguire
You Had Me at Hello (album), the debut album by Bury Your Dead, named after the line
"You Had Me at Hello", a song by A Day to Remember from their debut album, And Their Name Was Treason

See also
 "Hello", a song by Beyoncé from I Am... Sasha Fierce, which repeats the phrase "You Had Me at Hello" throughout its refrain